"A Night to Remember" is the eighth episode of the second season  of the American television drama series Mad Men. It was written by Matthew Weiner and Robin Vieth; and was directed by Lesli Linka Glatter. The episode originally aired on September 14, 2008.

Plot 
Betty Draper is struggling over how to confront Don Draper (Jon Hamm) about his recent affair with Bobbie Barrett. Don and Betty are planning a small dinner party at their house for Crab Colson, the Sterlings, and Duck Phillips. Don tells Betty it is not a big deal, but she wants everything to be perfect. While cleaning, Betty sees that one of the dining room chairs has a loose leg and she bangs it repeatedly until it breaks into pieces.

At the office, Harry Crane is having difficulty keeping up with the work load as the head of the television department. When Roger denies his request for another employee, Joan steps in to help. She comes to enjoy reading the scripts, coming up with ideas, and giving feedback. Her fiancé, meanwhile, disapproves of her working, and encourages her to quit soon. Joan does such a good job reviewing the scripts that Roger agrees to hire someone to help Harry. Joan is called into Harry's office to meet the new hire and to teach him how to do the job. She agrees, clearly disappointed that she has been replaced. 

Father Gill asks Peggy Olson for her help in jazzing up a flyer for the Catholic Young Organization dance. She comes up with the slogan “A Night to Remember” and the image of a couple dancing, but is informed by Father Gill that the ladies on the committee do not think it is appropriate. Peggy cites her expertise in the field, and Father Gill asks her to visit the church and speak to the women herself. Upon meeting with the committee, they are still unhappy with Peggy's advertisement and Father Gill does not back her up. She agrees to change the design and confronts Father Gill over his lack of support for which he apologizes.

At the Draper's dinner party, Betty has set up a “trip around the world” for their meal with food from different cultures, including Heineken from Holland. Don and Duck are amused because Heineken is a client of Sterling Cooper's, and Don has been trying to convince them that housewives are their primary market. Everyone laughs, but Betty is clearly upset by the situation. After the dinner party, she accuses Don of embarrassing her and believing he knows everything about her. She then works up the courage to tell him she knows he is having an affair with Bobbie Barrett. Don vehemently denies it, and accuses Jimmy Barrett of lying when he told Betty about the affair. Betty remains unconvinced and searches through Don's things the next day while he is at work for proof, but finds nothing. That night, Betty wakes up Don and asks him if he loves her. He declares that he loves her and the children and that he did not cheat, leaving Betty unsure of what to think.

Father Gill visits Sterling Cooper to make copies of the CYO flyer. While there, he tries to convince Peggy to open up about her child. Peggy seems to consider it for a moment, but then brushes him off. At home, Betty watches tv with the children when and an Utz commercial featuring Jimmy Barrett comes on. The footage of Jimmy reminds Betty of her instincts, and she calls Don at work and tells him, “Don’t come home. I don’t care what you do, I just don’t want you here.” He is left shocked and gets a Heineken out of the fridge to drink alone in the office.

Production 
Series creator and executive producer Matthew Weiner wrote “A Night to Remember” together with Robin Veith. This episode was directed by Lesli Linka Glatter.

In an interview with AMCTV, Weiner explains how in real life, there is a certain time to say things on your mind. He explains that sometimes you don’t know how to say it so it comes out of nowhere. Weiner also explains how the scene between Father Gill and Peggy is set up like a confessional, giving her the opportunity to share the truth, which she denies. Jon Hamm and January Jones also share their own perspectives. Jones explains when she says, “you embarrassed me in front of all these people”, talking about the dinner party, she is deep down explaining in general with everything that happened with Bobbie Barrett. Hamm also explains how he is torn. He “desperately wants this to work and yet, he’s genuinely unsure of if he really loves his wife.”

Reception 
This episode had a total of 1.87 million viewers, which is a slight decline from 2.1 million the first episode of season two had.

Alan Sepinwall was a fan of how Christina Hendricks (Joan) was so perfect in the moment where Harry unwittingly delivered the news to Joan that Danny was taking over and Joan needed to fill him in on what she’d been doing. Noel Murray, writing for The A.V. Club in 2008, praised the episode for containing moments that were concise, funny, and character defining. Examples are when Betty smashed the wobbly chair from the dining room and when Peggy was pretending to be her own secretary. Dan Owen, from Dan’s Media Digest, wrote about how suitable the title of the episode was since it was the night that Betty confronts Don about his affairs, making it a real turning point in the series. The Chicago Tribune compliments how January Jones (Betty) has grown as an actress from the amount of intense work she had to do in this episode and how her performance was restrained, nuanced, and detailed.

References

External links 
 

Mad Men (season 2) episodes
2008 American television episodes
Television episodes directed by Lesli Linka Glatter